This is a list of lighthouses in Equatorial Guinea.

Lighthouses

See also
List of lighthouses in Cameroon (to the west)
List of lighthouses in Gabon (to the east)
 Lists of lighthouses and lightvessels

References

External links

Equatorial Guinea
Lighthouses
Lighthouses